Pellacalyx saccardianus is a species of plant in the Rhizophoraceae family. It is found in Malaysia and Singapore.

References

Rhizophoraceae
Least concern plants
Taxonomy articles created by Polbot